Jonathan S. Comer, Ph.D. is a Professor of Psychology and Psychiatry at Florida International University. He is currently the director of an interdisciplinary clinical research program called the Mental Health Interventions and Technology (MINT) Program. The MINT program focuses on improving the quality, scope, and accessibility of mental health care. Comer is a Fellow of the American Psychological Association and a leader in the field of clinical child and adolescent psychology. The author of over 140 scientific papers and chapters, he has received early career awards from the American Psychological Association, the Association for Psychological Science, and the Association for Behavioral and Cognitive Therapies for his work. His research has been funded by federal agencies (such as the National Institute of Mental Health, the National Institute of Child Health and Human Development, and the National Science Foundation) and by several private foundations and non-profit organizations. He has also received funding from the Andrew Kukes Foundation for Social Anxiety.

Comer received his B.A. from the University of Rochester. He attended graduate school at Temple University where he received his M.A. and Ph.D. in Clinical Psychology with a Concentration in Developmental Psychopathology. Comer completed his clinical psychology internship training at the NYU-Bellevue Clinical Psychology Internship Program and at the NYU Child Study Center in the Child and Adolescent Track. After completing his clinical psychology internship training, Comer completed an NIH-funded Postdoctoral Research Fellowship in Child Psychiatry at Columbia University. At Columbia, he also served as Chief Research Fellow in the Division of Child and Adolescent Psychiatry.

Research 
Comer's research examines four overlapping areas of study. First, his work focuses on the development of innovative methods to improve access to effective mental health treatments and services. He conducts research on new technologies (such as video conferencing and mobile platforms) to meaningfully expand the reach of mental health care. He also uses epidemiologic datasets to determine problems in the quality and accessibility of mental health services. Second, he has focused much of his career on exploring anxiety disorders and behavioral issues which appear early in life. Third, he studies the course of disorders that may develop in children and families following certain traumas. He has published extensively, and received media attention, on the impact of the 9/11 terror attacks and the Boston Marathon bombing. Additionally, Comer served as a consultant throughout the federal trial of United States v. Dzhokhar Tsarnaev. Fourth, Comer's work in recent years has expanded to study biological markers and neurocircuitry patterns associated with psychopathology and internalizing problems.

Books 
Comer has authored several undergraduate and graduate textbooks and handbooks, including Abnormal Psychology, 10th edition (Comer & Comer, 2018) and The Oxford Handbook of Research Strategies for Clinical Psychology (Comer & Kendall, 2013).

Professional Roles 
Comer is the President-Elect of the Society of Clinical Psychology (Division 12 of the American Psychological Association). He is also an elected Officer in the Society of Clinical Child and Adolescent Psychology where he serves on the board of directors. Comer is Associate Editor of Behavior Therapy and Editor-in-Chief of the Clinical Psychologist. He also serves as Chair of the Miami International Child and Adolescent Mental Health (MICAMH) conference, an annual interdisciplinary conference hosted at Florida International University that presents evidence-based practices in child and adolescent mental health.

References

External links
Google scholar profile

Cognitive-behavioral psychotherapists
21st-century American psychologists
Living people
Florida International University faculty
1977 births